Maple Lake is a lake in the southern portion of Haliburton County, Ontario, Canada. Maple Lake is located north-east of Carnarvon and north-west of Haliburton and is easily reached via Highway 118 on its southern shores and North Shore Road for northern lakeshore access. The lake is annually stocked with Lake Trout.  Anglers also fish for whitefish, largemouth and smallmouth bass.  A population of muskie does also exist in the lake, although fishing for this is generally fairly slow. It is part of a chain of lakes.

See also
List of lakes in Ontario

References

Lakes of Haliburton County